The 2022 Gold Coast Titans season is the 16th season in the history of Gold Coast Titans rugby league football club. The team is coached by Justin Holbrook and captained by Tino Fa'asuamaleaui. The 2022 season is the first Titans season to feature the new club logo.

The Titans finished 8th in the previous season qualifying for the finals series, for which they were eliminated from in the elimination final by The Sydney Roosters.

Squad Information

Transfers

Transfers in

Transfers out

Friendlies

Competitions

Overview 

Last updated: 11 May 2022

National Rugby League

League table

Results by Round

Matches 
The league fixtures were announced on 9 November 2021

Statistics

Appearances and contributions

Try scorers

Goalscorers

See also 

 2022 NRL season
 List of Gold Coast Titans' seasons

Footnotes 
a. The match was originally scheduled for 14:00 AEST (UTC+10:00) 26 February at Moreton Daily Stadium, where it was postponed to 19:00 AEST (UTC+10:00) 28 February and moved to Robina Stadium due to the 2022 eastern Australia floods. The match was later cancelled for the same reason.

References 

Gold Coast Titans seasons
Gold Coast Titans season
2022 NRL Women's season